Redding station is an intercity train station served by Amtrak's Coast Starlight, located in Redding, California, United States. The depot was built by the Southern Pacific Railroad in 1923 and opened on February 5, 1924. The train station has sheltered waiting areas on both platforms and a parking lot near the southbound platform. 

Due to the way schedules are aligned, both the northbound and the southbound Coast Starlight pass through Redding in the middle of the night, when no connecting transit systems are usually operating. Amtrak Thruway motorcoach route 3 provides additional service in northern California during the daytime hours, connecting Redding to Chico, Davis, Sacramento and Stockton, where passengers can connect to San Joaquins trains.

Redding Area Bus Authority's Downtown Transit Center is located on the opposite side of the tracks from the station. The transit center is the main transit hub in Shasta County, served by most Redding Area Bus Authority routes, along with other interregional transportation services including Greyhound Lines, Sage Stage and Trinity Transit.

References

External links 

Redding, CA – USA Rail Guide (TrainWeb)

Redding, California
Amtrak stations in California
Transportation buildings and structures in Shasta County, California
Railway stations in the United States opened in 1872
Former Southern Pacific Railroad stations in California
Buildings and structures in Redding, California
1872 establishments in California